Nightwing is a fictional superhero appearing in comic books published by DC Comics.

Nightwing may also refer to:

Music
Nightwing (band), a British rock band
Nightwing (album), a 1997 album by Swedish black metal band Marduk
"Nightwing", a song on Black Sabbath's 1989 album, Headless Cross
Nightwings (Stanley Turrentine album), a 1977 jazz album
Nightwings (Pat Martino album), a 1994 jazz album

Other uses
Nightwing (film), a 1979 American horror film
Nightwing (novel), a 1977 thriller by Martin Cruz Smith
Nightwings (novella), 1968 science fiction novella by Robert Silverberg
NightWings, a tribe of dragons in the fantasy novel series Wings of Fire

See also 
 Nite-Wing, a character from the comic series Nightwing